South Cle Elum is a town in Kittitas County, Washington, United States. The population was 532 at the 2010 census.

History
In 1909, the Chicago, Milwaukee & Puget Sound Railway chose Cle Elum as a division point between the Coast and Columbia divisions on its future transcontinental line. When it was determined that Milwaukee's mainline would end up running one mile south of the city, South Cle Elum was platted. Maintenance shops and workers' bunkers were built as well as a train station. South Cle Elum was officially incorporated on August 28, 1911.

Geography
South Cle Elum is located at  (47.185633, −120.953019).

Climate

Demographics

2010 census
As of the census of 2010, there were 532 people, 235 households, and 145 families residing in the town. The racial makeup of the town was 93.2% White, 0.4% African American, 1.5% Native American, 0.8% Asian, 1.5% from other races, and 2.6% from two or more races. Hispanic or Latino of any race were 5.1% of the population.

There were 235 households, of which 28.5% had children under the age of 18 living with them, 49.8% were married couples living together, 8.9% had a female householder with no husband present, 3.0% had a male householder with no wife present, and 38.3% were non-families. 30.2% of all households were made up of individuals, and 11.5% had someone living alone who was 65 years of age or older. The average household size was 2.26 and the average family size was 2.80.

The median age in the town was 42.8 years. 21.2% of residents were under the age of 18; 8% were between the ages of 18 and 24; 24% were from 25 to 44; 28.3% were from 45 to 64; and 18.6% were 65 years of age or older. The gender makeup of the town was 49.6% male and 50.4% female.

2000 census
At the 2000 census, there were 457 people, 185 households and 123 families residing in the town. The population density was 1,089.5 per square mile (420.1/km2). There were 210 housing units at an average density of 500.6 per square mile (193.1/km2). The racial makeup of the town was 94.09% White, 1.31% Native American, 0.22% Asian, 2.41% from other races, and 1.97% from two or more races. Hispanic or Latino of any race were 4.38% of the population.

There were 185 households, of which 35.1% had children under the age of 18 living with them, 54.6% were married couples living together, 7.6% had a female householder with no husband present, and 33.5% were non-families. 29.7% of all households were made up of individuals, and 15.1% had someone living alone who was 65 years of age or older. The average household size was 2.47 and the average family size was 3.03.

Age distribution was 29.5% under the age of 18, 3.3% from 18 to 24, 30.0% from 25 to 44, 22.5% from 45 to 64, and 14.7% who were 65 years of age or older. The median age was 38 years. For every 100 females, there were 103.1 males. For every 100 females age 18 and over, there were 96.3 males.

The median household income was $45,833, and the median family income was $53,750. Males had a median income of $35,625; females, $21,625. The per capita income for the town was $22,375. About 8.1% of families and 6.6% of the population were below the poverty line, including 3.9% of those under age 18 and 7.6% of those age 65 or over.

Points of Interest in South Cle Elum
 Former Milwaukee Road depot: This depot, originally built in 1909, has been restored and now houses a museum of railroad artifacts.  The telegrapher's desk and equipment have been set up to show visitors how messages were communicated in the early days.  There is also a cafe with fixtures that represent the original "beanery;" a place for railroad workers to eat.
 The Iron Horse State Park: This former right-of-way for the Milwaukee Road today serves as a path for hikers, cross-country skiers and horseback riders.  An interpretive trail, near the former depot, shows locations of important structures, such as the roundhouse.  From I-90 at exit #84, follow signs to South Cle Elum. Once in town, follow signs to parking area.
 Former Milwaukee Road Bunkhouse:  Now a B&B.

Notable people
 Douglas Albert Munro, the first, and so far only, United States Coast Guard recipient of the Medal of Honor, for service during the Battle of Guadalcanal in World War II.
 The Smith family of S & S Logging, stars of Ax Men on the History Channel, reside in South Cle Elum.

References

Towns in Kittitas County, Washington
Towns in Washington (state)